Nedim Dal (born Edin Delić; on 3 May 1975) is a retired Turkish basketball player. He stands 2.14 m tall and played as a center. He holds Turkish and Bosnian citizenships and played for Turkey in late 1990s and early 2000s.

References

External links 
TBLStat.net Profile
TurkSport.Net Profile

1975 births
Living people
Anadolu Efes S.K. players
Antalya Büyükşehir Belediyesi players
Bosnia and Herzegovina men's basketball players
Bosnia and Herzegovina emigrants to Turkey
Centers (basketball)
Fenerbahçe men's basketball players
Mersin Büyükşehir Belediyesi S.K. players
KK Sloboda Tuzla players
Naturalized citizens of Turkey
Oyak Renault basketball players
Turkish men's basketball players
Turkish people of Bosnia and Herzegovina descent
Türk Telekom B.K. players